This is a list of coats of arms of Poland.

Historical coats of arms

Restored Poland

Coats of Arms of Governorates of Russian Empire in the Congress of Poland

Voivodeships of Poland
This is a list of coats of arms of the voivodeships (first-level subdivisions) of Poland.

Projects 1919–1939

Armorial of Presidents of Poland

Military Eagle

Voivodeship

Greater Poland Voivodeship

Kuyavian-Pomeranian Voivodeship

Lesser Poland Voivodeship

Łódź Voivodeship

Lower Silesian Voivodeship

Lublin Voivodeship

Lubusz Voivodeshipp

Masovian Voivodeship

Opole Voivodeship

Podlaskie Voivodeship

Pomeranian Voivodeship

Podkarpackie Voivodeship

Świętokrzyskie Voivodeship

Warmian-Masurian Voivodeship

West Pomeranian Voivodeship

See also 
 Flags of Polish voivodeships

References 

 
Coats of arms